Sial Sharif is a  village in the Sargodha District of Punjab, Pakistan.

Care of the shrine 

After the death of Muhammad Shams Din, care of the shrine passed to Muhammad Din and, after his demise in 1909, to his son Muhammad Zia-ud-Din. It subsequently passed on to his eldest son Khwaja Qamar ul Din Sialvi (7 July 1906 – 20 July 1981), president of the Sargodha branch of Muslim League who became famous for donating all his valuables to the Pakistani Army during the Indo-Pakistani War of 1965. Muhammad Qamar-ud-Din later, in 1970, became president of Jamiat Ulema-i-Pakistan and member of Islamic Ideology Council, in 1981 receiving Tamgha-e-Imtiaz (Medal of Distinction) from the President of Pakistan.

References

Populated places in Sargodha District
Barelvi
Shrines in Pakistan